Lucian Blaga (9 May 1895 – 6 May 1961) was a Romanian philosopher, poet, playwright, poetry translator and novelist. He was a commanding personality of the Romanian culture of the interbellum period.

Biography

Blaga was born on 9 May 1895 in Lámkerék (now Lancrăm), near Gyulafehérvár (now Alba Iulia), Kingdom of Hungary, Austria-Hungary, his father being an Orthodox priest. He later described his early childhood, in the autobiographical The Chronicle and the Song of Ages, as "under the sign of the incredible absence of the word".

His elementary education was in Hungarian at Szászsebes (now Sebeș) (1902–1906), after which he attended the "Andrei Șaguna" Highschool in Brassó (now Brașov) (1906–1914), under the supervision of a relative, Iosif Blaga (Lucian's father had died when the former was 13), who was the author of the first Romanian treatise on the theory of drama. At the outbreak of the First World War, he began theological studies at Nagyszeben (now Sibiu), where he graduated in 1917. He published his first philosophy article on the Bergson theory of subjective time. From 1917 to 1920, he attended courses at the University of Vienna, where he studied philosophy and obtained his PhD.

Upon returning to Transylvania, now a part of Romania, he contributed to the Romanian press, being the editor of the magazines Culture in Cluj and The Banat in Lugoj.

In 1926, he became involved in Romanian diplomacy, occupying successive posts at Romania's legations in Warsaw, Prague, Lisbon, Bern and Vienna. His political protector was the famous poet Octavian Goga, who was briefly a prime minister; Blaga was a relative of his wife. He was elected a titular member of the Romanian Academy in 1936. His acceptance speech was entitled Elogiul satului românesc (In Praise of the Romanian Village).

In 1939, he became professor of cultural philosophy at the University of Cluj, temporarily located in Sibiu in the years following the Second Vienna Award. During his stay in Sibiu, he edited, beginning in 1943, the annual magazine Saeculum.

He was dismissed from his university professor chair in 1948 because he refused to express his support to the new Communist regime and he worked as librarian for the Cluj branch of the History Institute of the Romanian Academy. He was forbidden to publish new books, and until 1960 he was allowed to publish only translations. He completed the translation of Faust, the masterpiece of Goethe, one of the German writers that influenced him most.

In 1956, he was nominated to the Nobel Prize for Literature on the proposal of Bazil Munteanu of France and Rosa del Conte of Italy, but it seems the idea was Mircea Eliade's. Still, the Romanian Communist government sent two emissaries to Sweden to protest against the nomination, because Blaga was considered an idealist philosopher, and his poems were forbidden until 1962.

He was diagnosed with cancer and died on 6 May 1961. He was buried on his birthday, 9 May, in the countryside village cemetery of Lancrăm, Romania.

He was married to Cornelia (née Brediceanu).

The University of Sibiu bears his name today.

Literature

Poetry
Mirabila samanta:
 1919 – Poems of Light (Poemele luminii)
 1921 – The Prophet's Footsteps (Pașii profetului)
 1924 – In the Great Passage (În marea trecere)
 1929 – In Praise of Sleep (Laudă somnului)
 1933 – At the Watershed (La cumpăna apelor) 
 1938 – At the Courtyard of Yearning (La curțile dorului) 
 1942 - Iron age (Varsta de fier) 
 1943 – Unsuspected Steps (Nebănuitele trepte)
 1982 – 3 Posthumous Poems

Drama

 1921 – Zalmoxis, a Pagan Mystery
 1923 – Whirling Waters
 1925 – Daria, The Deed, Resurrection
 1927 – Manole the Craftsman (Mesterul Manole)
 1930 – The Children's Crusade
 1934 – Avram Iancu
 1944 – Noah's Ark
 1964 – Anton Pann – published posthumously.

Philosophy

His philosophical work is grouped in four trilogies:
 Filosofia cunoașterii (gnoseology) (1943)
 Filosofia culturii (culture) (1944)
 Filosofia valorilor (values) (1946)
 Filosofia cosmologică (cosmology) (1983 posthumously)

The fourth work, Cosmologica, was completed but not published at the time because of communist regime censorship. Before death, Blaga left an editorial testament on how his works are to be published posthumously 

The novel Charon's Ferry is intended to be a companion to the philosophical trilogies. In it Blaga addresses some of the more problematic philosophical issues such as those pertaining to political, (para)psychological or occult phenomena, under the name of a fictive philosopher (Leonte Pătrașcu).

Philosophical works
 1924 - "The Philosophy of Style"
 1925 - "The Original Phenomenon" and "The Facets of a Century"
 1931 - "The Dogmatic Aeon"
 1933 - "Luciferian Knowledge"
 1934 - "Transcendental Censorship"
 1936 – "Horizon and Style" and "The Mioritic Space"
 1937 – "The Genesis of Metaphor and the Meaning of Culture"
 1939 – "Art and Value"
 1940 – "The Divine Differentials"
 1942 – "Religion and Spirit" and "Science and Creation"
 1943 – The Trilogy of Knowledge (The Dogmatic Aeon, Luciferian Knowledge, Transcendent Censorship; in 1983, On Philosophical Cognition and Experiment and the Mathematical Spirit was added posthumously according to his will)
 1944 – The Trilogy of Culture (Horizon and Style, The Mioritic Space, The Genesis of Metaphor and the Meaning of Culture)
 1946 – The Trilogy of Values (Science and Creation, Magical Thinking and Religion, Art and Value)
 1959 – Historical Existence
 1966 – Romanian Thought in Transylvania in the 18th Century
 1968 – Horizons and Stages
 1969 – Experiment and the Mathematical Spirit
 1972 – Sources (essays, lectures, articles)
 1974 – On Philosophical Cognition
 1977 – Philosophical Essays
 1983 – The Cosmological Trilogy (The Divine Differentials, Anthropological Aspects, Historical Existence)

Other works

1919 – Stones for My Temple, aphorisms
1945 – Discoblus, aphorisms
1965 – The Chronicle and Song of Ages, memoirs
1977 – The Élan of the Island, aphorisms
1990 – Charon's Ferry, novel

Presence in English language anthologies 

Born in Utopia - An anthology of Modern and Contemporary Romanian Poetry - Carmen Firan and Paul Doru Mugur (editors) with Edward Foster - Talisman House Publishers - 2006 - 
Testament – Anthology of Modern Romanian Verse / Testament - Antologie de Poezie Română Modernă – Bilingual Edition English & Romanian – Daniel Ioniță (editor and translator) with Eva Foster, Daniel Reynaud and Rochelle Bews – Minerva Publishing 2012 and 2015 (second edition) - 
Testament - Anthology of Romanian Verse - American Edition - monolingual English language edition - Daniel Ioniță (editor and principal translator) with Eva Foster, Daniel Reynaud and Rochelle Bews - Australian-Romanian Academy for Culture - 2017 - 
Testament - 400 Years of Romanian Poetry - 400 de ani de poezie românească - bilingual edition - Daniel Ioniță (editor and principal translator) with Daniel Reynaud, Adriana Paul & Eva Foster - Editura Minerva, 2019 - \
Romanian Poetry from its Origins to the Present - bilingual edition English/Romanian - Daniel Ioniță (editor and principal translator) with Daniel Reynaud, Adriana Paul and Eva Foster - Australian-Romanian Academy Publishing - 2020 -  ; LCCN - 2020907831

References

Bibliography
 Gridan, Simona. “Aforismele lui Lucian Blaga - Relaţia cu proverbele româneşti”. The Central and Eastern European Online Library, no volume given, no. 2 (2019), pp. 44–48.
 Todoran, Eugen (1985), Lucian Blaga, mitul dramatic, Timișoara: Facla.
 Mihăilescu, Dan C. (1984), Dramaturgia lui Lucian Blaga, Cluj: Editura Dacia.
 Pop, Ion (1981), Lucian Blaga – universul liric, Bucharest: Cartea Românească.
 Gană, George (1976), Opera literară a lui Lucian Blaga, Bucharest: Editura Minerva.
  .
 Bălu, Ion (1986), Lucian Blaga, Bucharest: Editura Albatros.
 Micu, Dumitru (1967), Lirica lui Blaga, Bucharest: Editura pentru literatură.
 Iţu, Mircia (2007), Marele Anonim şi cenzura transcendentă la Blaga. Brahman şi māyā la Śaṅkara, in Caiete critice 6–7 (236–237), Bucharest, pages 75–83 .
 Todoran, Eugen (1981–1983), Lucian Blaga, mitul poetic, vol. I-II, Timișoara: Facla.
 Micu, Dumitru (1970), Estetica lui Lucian Blaga, Bucharest: Editura Științifică.
  Maciu, Andreea. MAN - OPENER OF MYSTERIES IN LUCIAN BLAGA'S POETRY. Globalization and Intercultural Dialogue: Multidisciplinary Perspectives, Section: Literature, pp. 237–242. (Abstract in English)

External links

Lucian Blaga – Poezii
Lucian Blaga, Philosopher and Poet
Lucian Blaga (1895–1961)
Internet Encyclopedia of Philosophy: Blaga, Lucian (1895–1961)

1895 births
1961 deaths
Academic staff of Babeș-Bolyai University
Gândirea
People from Sebeș
Romanian Austro-Hungarians
Romanian male poets
Romanian translators
University of Vienna alumni
Aphorists
Deaths from cancer in Romania
Male dramatists and playwrights
20th-century Romanian poets
20th-century Romanian dramatists and playwrights
20th-century translators
Titular members of the Romanian Academy
20th-century Romanian male writers
Translators of Johann Wolfgang von Goethe
20th-century Romanian philosophers